George W. Gillie (August 15, 1880 – July 3, 1963) was an American veterinarian and politician who served five terms as a U.S. Representative from Indiana from 1939 to 1949.

Biography 
Born in Berwickshire, Scotland, Gillie moved to the United States with his parents, who settled in Kankakee, Illinois, in 1882 and in Fort Wayne, Indiana, in 1884.
He attended the public schools, International Business College, Fort Wayne, Indiana, in 1898, and Purdue University, Lafayette, Indiana from 1899 to 1901.

He graduated from the Ohio State University at Columbus in 1907 as a doctor of veterinary surgery. He worked as a meat and dairy inspector of Allen County, Indiana from 1908 to 1914. Later, he began the practice of veterinary medicine in Fort Wayne, Indiana, in 1914, and went on to be a sheriff in Allen County 1917-1920 from 1929 to 1930, and 1935-1937.

Congress 
Gillie was elected as a Republican to the Seventy-sixth and to the four succeeding Congresses (January 3, 1939 – January 3, 1949).
He was an unsuccessful candidate for reelection in 1948 to the Eighty-first Congress.

Later career and death 
Gillie engaged in agricultural pursuits. He served as jury commissioner for the Federal courts for the northern district of Indiana. He was a resident of Fort Wayne, Indiana, until his death there on July 3, 1963.
He was interred in Lindenwood Cemetery.

References

1880 births
1963 deaths
Ohio State University College of Veterinary Medicine alumni
Indiana sheriffs
Politicians from Fort Wayne, Indiana
20th-century American politicians
Scottish emigrants to the United States
Republican Party members of the United States House of Representatives from Indiana